Hush Rush is the debut extended play by South Korean singer Chaeyeon. The EP was released by WM Entertainment on October 12, 2022, and contains four tracks, including the lead single of the same name.

Background and release
On September 15, 2022, WM Entertainment announced that Chaeyeon, former member of Iz*One, would be debuting as a soloist in October 2022. On September 29, it was announced Chaeyeon would be releasing her first extended play titled Hush Rush on October 12. On October 5, the track listing was released with "Hush Rush" announced as the lead single. Six days later, the tracks sampler teaser video was released. On October 12, the music video teaser for "Hush Rush" was released. The EP was released alongside the music video for "Hush Rush" on October 12.

Composition
Hush Rush consists of four tracks. The lead single "Hush Rush" was described as a "emotional" dance-pop song with lyrics about "feeling the most freedom on stage like a vampire who wakes up and dances freely under the moonlight and falls in love with that self". The second track "Danny" was described as a "80s vibe" synth-pop song with lyrics about "the comparison of fan's relationship with their idols for a long time to a lifelong couple". The third track "Aquamarine" was described as a song "with a groovy bass characterized by various instrumental". The last track "Same But Different" was described as a dance song.

Commercial performance
Hush Rush debuted at number ten on South Korea's Circle Album Chart in the chart issue dated October 9–15, 2022.

Promotion
Prior to the release of Hush Rush, Chaeyeon held a live event to introduce the extended play and its song, and to communicate with her fans.

Track listing

Charts

Weekly charts

Monthly charts

Sales

Release history

References

2022 debut EPs
Korean-language EPs
Genie Music EPs
Stone Music Entertainment EPs